Al-Jāmi’a Alasmarya  is a public university in the city of Zliten, Libya, specializing in Islamic sciences such as Islamic theology and Islamic jurisprudence.  Founded in 1995, the university’s academic instruction is conducted from October to March. Statistics from the 1998-1999 academic year indicated a total of 14 teaching staff members and 506 full-time students. The university's academic departments include:
Shariah (Islamic religious law)
Arabic Language
Usul al-din
Al-dawa, al-emama and al-khataba

See also
Abd As-Salam Al-Asmar
Islam in Libya
Zliten

Notes

References
Development of Education in the Great Jamahiriya: Report to the International Conference on Education: Session 47, Geneva 2004
UNESCO Libya
List of Libyan Universities

External links 
 Alasmarya University website

Educational institutions established in 1981
Islamic universities and colleges
Zliten
Alasmarya
1981 establishments in Libya